Red Giant (foaled February 28, 2004 in Kentucky) is an American Thoroughbred racehorse who in September 2008 set a world record for 1¼ miles on Turf.

Trained by Todd Pletcher, at Colonial Downs in New Kent County, Virginia, Red Giant notably won the July 21, 2007 Virginia Derby in course record time. He suffered an ankle injury in early October that kept him out of racing until August 2008. He returned to win the Fourstardave Handicap on Turf at Saratoga Race Course under jockey John Velazquez. He was then sent to Santa Anita Park in California where Velazquez rode him to victory in the Grade I Clement L. Hirsch Turf Championship Stakes in a world record time of 1:57.16 for 1¼ miles on Turf.

Offspring
In January 2009, Red Giant was retired from racing to stand at stud at Hill 'n' Dale Farms in Lexington, Kentucky.

The first reported foal for Red Giant was a filly out of Carolyn Frances (by Personal Flag) born on January 30, 2010, at Clear Creek Stud in Louisiana. The second foal was a colt out of Brazilian (by Stravinsky) born on February 2, 2010, at Taylor Made Farm in Nicholasville, Kentucky.

Notable stock

c = colt, f = filly, g = gelding

References

 Red Giant's pedigree and partial racing stats
 ESPN story on Red Giant's win in the 2008 Clement Hirsch Turf Championship
 January 23, 2009 NTRA article on Red Giant's retirement 

2004 racehorse births
Racehorses bred in Kentucky
Racehorses trained in the United States
Thoroughbred family 22-b